William J. LaMure (October 22, 1829April 5, 1915) was an American farmer, cattle dealer, and Wisconsin pioneer.  He was a member of the Wisconsin State Assembly, representing southern Outagamie County and northern Calumet County during the 1885 and 1887 sessions.  With his parents, he was one of the earliest settlers at the town of Buchanan, Wisconsin.

Biography
William LaMure was born on October 22, 1829, in what is now Green Bay, Wisconsin.  His parents were early settlers in what was then the western part of the Michigan Territory.  At about age 10, he moved with his parents to the area that is now the town of Buchanan, Wisconsin, where there were just two settlers then living.  He attended the frontier schools at Green Bay and, after moving south, at the settlement at Little Chute.

LaMure became active in local politics. He was chairman of the town of Buchanan for 25 years and served four years on the county board of supervisors.  He also served 35 years as director of the school board and served as treasurer of the school district.

In 1884, he was elected to the Wisconsin State Assembly running on the Democratic Party ticket.  He was re-elected in 1886, but his district was abolished in the 1888 redistricting; he did not seek election in his new district.  His district had comprised the southeast corner of Outgamie County and the northwest corner of Calumet County.  He did run again for Assembly in 1896, but was defeated by Republican Charles Clack.

After leaving office, LaMure relocated his main residence into the nearby city of Kaukauna, Wisconsin.  He became an investor and director of the New Holstein Insurance Company, and was president of the Appleton Dairy Board of Trade.

He died at Kaukauna on April 5, 1915.

Personal life and family
William LaMure was the only child of Joseph LaMure and his wife Genevieve "Jennie" ( Derochier) to survive childhood.  He married Louisa Porlier on October 5, 1852, whose parents were also early pioneers of Outagamie County.  They had at least 11 children, though the parents outlived at least six of their children.

On his death, LaMure's will apparently bequeathed nearly his entire estate to the Darboy Cemetery Association, neglecting his wife and surviving children.  The probate court, however, declared the will invalid and disbursed the estate to his survivors.

Electoral history

Wisconsin Assembly (1884, 1886)

| colspan="6" style="text-align:center;background-color: #e9e9e9;"| General Election, November 8, 1884

| colspan="6" style="text-align:center;background-color: #e9e9e9;"| General Election, November 2, 1886

Wisconsin Assembly (1896)

| colspan="6" style="text-align:center;background-color: #e9e9e9;"| General Election, November 3, 1896

References

External links

1829 births
1915 deaths
Politicians from Green Bay, Wisconsin
People from Kaukauna, Wisconsin
Democratic Party members of the Wisconsin State Assembly
19th-century American politicians